Spermatogenesis-defective protein 39 homolog is a protein that in humans is encoded by the VIPAS39 gene. This protein is involved in the sorting of lysosomal proteins. Mutations in this gene are associated with ARCS2 (arthrogryposis, renal dysfunction, and cholestasis-2). Alternative splicing results in multiple transcript variants.

References

External links

Further reading